Loxophlebia omalesia is a moth of the subfamily Arctiinae. It was described by Schaus in 1920. It is found in Guatemala.

References

 Natural History Museum Lepidoptera generic names catalog

Loxophlebia
Moths described in 1920
Arctiinae of South America